The 2006–07 season was Reading Football Club's first season in the Premier League, and their first season in the top flight of English football. Reading also participated in the League Cup, beating Darlington in the second round before losing 4–3 to Liverpool at Anfield. Reading entered the FA Cup at the third round stage, defeating Burnley 3–2 and then Birmingham City by the same score to meet Manchester United in the Fifth Round. After drawing the initial game 1–1 at Old Trafford, Reading lost 2–3 at home in the replay ten days later, conceding the three goals in the first six minutes of the match. They collected 55 points from 38 matches which was good enough for eighth place, making this Reading's best ever league season.

Review and events

August
Reading's first ever Premier League game came at home to Middlesbrough. Reading were 2–0 down after 20 minutes after goals from Stewart Downing and Yakubu, but ended up 3−2 winners through goals from Dave Kitson, Steve Sidwell and Leroy Lita. Kitson, however, was injured in a reckless tackle by Chris Riggott, and would not play again until the end of January 2007.

Reading's next game was against Aston Villa. After an early lead through Kevin Doyle, Ibrahima Sonko conceded a penalty and was sent off. Juan Pablo Ángel scored the resulting penalty for Villa, and Gareth Barry scored in the 61st minute to seal a win for Villa. The Royals next played Wigan Athletic, Emile Heskey scoring the only goal in a 1−0 win for Wigan.

September
In September, Reading's first game was against Manchester City, live on Sky Sports at home. Ívar Ingimarsson scored the only goal, despite being knocked unconscious before scoring. The first game against a side promoted with Reading was Sheffield United. Kevin Doyle scored after 16 seconds and in the 25th minute, followed by Seol Ki-hyeon scoring a 25-yard goal. Rob Hulse pulled a goal back in the 61st minute, but it was not enough for Sheffield United, who lost 2−1. Reading's first cup game came against Darlington, but Reading needed penalties after an exciting 3−3 draw. Next up were league runners up Manchester United at the Madejski. Reading ensured it was goalless at half-time and went 1−0 up through a Kevin Doyle penalty after Gary Neville handballed. Cristiano Ronaldo, however, scored a 73rd-minute goal to make it 1−1.

October
In October, Reading played West Ham at Upton Park where a second-minute goal turned out to be the winner, scored by Seol. Reading–Chelsea hit the headlines as both Chelsea goalkeepers were knocked out in a match where the visitors took a fortuitous 1−0 win. Frank Lampard scored Chelsea's goal which took two deflections before going in. The goal was given as an Ívar Ingimarsson own goal. In the same match 2), Robin van Persie and Alexander Hleb scoring. Shane Long made his first Premier League start in this match. Reading also lost 4−3 to Liverpool in the Carling Cup (Reading were 3−0 down).

November
In November, Reading lost 2−0 to Liverpool (which was also the first ever league meeting between the two sides). The goals came from Dirk Kuyt. The Royals then won 3−1 against Tottenham Hotspur. Robbie Keane opened the scoring for Spurs before Nicky Shorey scored a 25-yard goal. Then Steve Sidwell scored a header on the stroke of half-time with Kevin Doyle completing the scoring to make it 3−1. Reading's next match was against Charlton. They won 2−0 with the goals coming from Seol Ki-hyeon and Doyle. They ended the month with a 1−0 win over Fulham with a penalty kick from Doyle, after the striker had been bought down by Ian Pearce.

December
In December, Reading Won 1−0 at Bolton, a Kevin Doyle goal won the match. Next was Reading's longest away trip this season when Reading played Newcastle United. Reading lost 3−2, an 84th-minute winner by Emre. Reading played Watford in the worst game of the season, Watford 0−0). Reading and Blackburn Rovers was the next game at the Madjeski. Reading went 1–0 up on half-time, but Rovers scored two goals to make it Reading 1−2 Rovers. Chelsea played Reading next, two months after the teams played in Reading; the match ended 2−2. Reading then played Manchester United: Reading were losing 1−0, but Sonko scored to level the game. United then scored two goals though Cristiano Ronaldo to make it 3−1, although Lita scored a consolation goal to make the final score United 3−2 Reading.

January
In January, Reading could not have got a better start. On New Year's Day, Reading put six past West Ham United. On 6 January, Reading were due to play Burnley in the FA Cup but it was postponed due to a waterlogged pitch, but Reading beat Burnley on the Tuesday night, a 3−2 win. Reading went to Everton unbeaten in the new year, and the game ended 1−1 in a match attended by Sylvester Stallone as an Everton supporter and guest of the chairman. Reading played Sheffield United at 2−0 Reading came a push-up in the dug out. Warnock and Downs sent off. Reading won 3−1. Reading Played Birmingham in the FA Cup (again). Birmingham had just enjoyed a 5−1 win at Newcastle United but they lost 3−2 to the Royals. Reading beat Wigan by the same score.

February
In February, Reading beat Manchester City away and Aston Villa at home. Both ending 2–0. At Old Trafford, Reading drew 1−1 with United in the FA Cup. Boro became the first team to beat Reading in 2007. Boro won 2−1. Reading were 3–0 down in the FA Cup 5th Round Replay against United in 5 minutes 41 seconds, but fought back to lose by only 3−2.

March to May
In March, April and May, Reading lost at Arsenal 2−1. Reading were 2−0 down, but drawing 0−0 at half-time, in the 87th minute when Arsenal scored an own goal courtesy of Cesc Fàbregas. Reading got a point at home to Portsmouth drawing 0−0. Reading lost to Spurs 1−0. Spurs scored a consolation penalty on half-time. Liverpool won at Reading 2−1. Liverpool's winner was in the 85th minute by Kuyt. Reading were held to a 0−0 draw at Charlton. Reading won at home to Fulham. They won at Bolton, 3−1, after being 1−0 down in the 85th minute. A midweek win at home to Newcastle United, 1−0, Kitson scored for the Royals. Reading shockingly lost to Watford at home 2−0. On the final day of the season, Reading played Blackburn Rovers away and needing a win to enter the UEFA Cup, Reading drew 3−3.

Squad

Left club during season

Transfers

In

Loans in

Out

Released

Competitions

Overview

Premier League

Results summary

Results by round

Results

League table

FA Cup

Football League Cup

Statistics

Appearances and goals

|-
|colspan="14"|Players who left Reading during the season:
|}

Goal scorers

Clean sheets

Disciplinary record

Awards

Premier League Manager of the Month

PFA Young Player of the Year

Barclays Golden Glove Award

References

Reading F.C. seasons
Reading